David Hepworth (born 27 July 1950) is a British music journalist, writer and publishing industry analyst who was instrumental in the foundation of a number of popular magazines in the 1980s, 1990s and 2000s. Along with the journalist, editor  and broadcaster Mark Ellen, he turned the pop magazine Smash Hits into one of the most popular UK music magazines of the 1980s. He co-presented the BBC broadcast of Live Aid on 13 July 1985.

Early life
David Hepworth was born in Dewsbury, then in the West Riding of Yorkshire, and attended the Queen Elizabeth Grammar School, Wakefield, and Trent Park College of Education. He worked for HMV and Beserkley Records, before becoming a freelance journalist.

Career
His career in journalism began with contributions to NME and Sounds. He joined the newly launched magazine Smash Hits in 1979, and two years later, after turning it around financially, became its editor. In 1983 he launched Just Seventeen, a perennially popular magazine for teenage girls, and in 1984 Looks. Since then he has launched several other magazines,  including Q (1986), More (1987), Empire (1988), Mojo (1993), Heat (1999) and The Word (2003). He is currently director of the publishing  company Development Hell.

In the early 1980s he presented the BBC television show The Old Grey Whistle Test and was one of the presenters covering Live Aid. On both of these he worked with long-term friend Mark Ellen. Hepworth famously provoked Bob Geldof to repeatedly use the word "fuck" live on air. Hepworth has written for The Guardian and for the UK trade magazine InPublishing.

In the 1990s he was a regular presenter on BBC GLR 94.9 – the BBC's Rock station for London.

In 2006, Hepworth sold his independent publishing company Development Hell to the EMAP group (today known as Ascential).

He now concentrates on publishing books on music nostalgia, his "David Hepworth's blog", and collaborations with Mark Ellen on Word In Your Ear, a series of podcasts and music-themed live events.

In 2021, Hepworth's book 1971 – Never a Dull Moment: Rock's Golden Year was adapted into the Apple TV+ documentary mini-series 1971: The Year That Music Changed Everything.

Publications
Abbey Road Studios at 90. London: Bantam, 2022. 
Overpaid, Oversexed and Over There: How a Few Skinny Brits with Bad Teeth Rocked America. London: Bantam, 2020. 
Rock & Roll A Level: The only quiz book you need. London: Bantam, 2020. 
A Fabulous Creation: How the LP Saved Our Lives. London: Bantam, 2019. 
Nothing is Real: The Beatles Were Underrated And Other Sweeping Statements About Pop. London: Bantam, 2018. 
Uncommon People: The Rise and Fall of the Rock Stars. London: Bantam, 2017. 
1971 – Never a Dull Moment: Rock's Golden Year. London: Bantam, 2016. 
The Secret History of Entertainment. London: Fourth Estate, 2010.

References

External links
 David Hepworth's blog
 Collection of Hepworth's In Publishing columns

1950 births
Living people
Alumni of Middlesex University
BBC television presenters
British magazine editors
British music critics
British music journalists
People educated at Queen Elizabeth Grammar School, Wakefield
People from Dewsbury
Rock critics